Peawanuck Airport  is located adjacent to Peawanuck, Ontario, Canada.

Airlines and destinations

Air Creebec and Thunder Air (contractor with ORNGE) offers fixed wing air ambulance transfers to Ontario and Quebec.

References

Certified airports in Kenora District